The Aviastroitel AC-7 is a Russian mid-wing, T-tailed, two seats in side-by-side configuration, glider that was designed by Vladimir Egorovich Fedorov and produced by Aviastroitel, now Glider Air Craft. It first flew in 2007.

Design and development
The AC-7 is derived from the AC-7M motor glider, but with a significantly redesigned fuselage. The AC-7 reduced fuselage wetted area as a result of eliminating the engine and propeller mounting space. It retains the two-seats in side-by-side configuration of the motor glider. Also revised is the complex four-wheeled fixed landing gear of the AC-7M, replaced on the AC-7 by a conventional retractable  tire, pneumatic-hydraulic suspended, monowheel gear, with a lever-operated hydraulic disc brake.

The aircraft's  span wing employs a Wortmann FX 60-157 airfoil, mounts Fowler flaps and optional winglets. The wings are mounted to the fuselage with a single cam-pin and the ailerons and air brakes hook-up automatically. The canopy provides 300° field of view and is jettisonable.

Specifications (AC-7)

See also

References

2000s Russian sailplanes
Aircraft first flown in 2007